Robert Henry ( – 21 September 1954) was a New Zealand lawn bowls player. At the 1950 British Empire Games in Auckland he won the gold medal in the men's pair alongside Phil Exelby. The pair, with Henry playing lead, won all three of their round-robin matches to take the title.

Henry arrived in New Zealand in about 1910. He was a police sergeant in Christchurch, and a member of the Sydenham Bowling Club in that city. He died in Christchurch on 21 September 1954, and was buried at the Ruru Lawn Cemetery.

References

Year of birth missing
1954 deaths
New Zealand male bowls players
Sportspeople from Christchurch
Commonwealth Games gold medallists for New Zealand
Bowls players at the 1950 British Empire Games
Commonwealth Games medallists in lawn bowls
New Zealand police officers
Burials at Ruru Lawn Cemetery
Medallists at the 1950 British Empire Games